The Erasmus Journal for Philosophy and Economics (EJPE) is a peer-reviewed open access interdisciplinary journal of philosophy, history, and economics. It is supported by the Erasmus Institute for Philosophy and Economics of Erasmus University Rotterdam, and is published twice a year. The journal also hosts the Mark Blaug Prize in Philosophy and Economics, awarded to a graduate student or recent graduate.

Abstracting and indexing 
The journal is abstracted and indexed in ABI/INFORM, Business Source Premier, Business Source Elite, EconLit, Philosopher's Index, and Scopus.

See also 
 List of economics journals
 List of history journals
 List of philosophy journals

References

External links 

Philosophy journals
Economics journals
Publications established in 2008
English-language journals
Biannual journals